Shridharrao Jawade is an Indian politician. He was elected to the Lok Sabha, the lower house of the Parliament of India as a member of the Indian National Congress.

References

External links
Official biographical sketch in Parliament of India website

India MPs 1977–1979
Lok Sabha members from Maharashtra
Living people
Year of birth missing (living people)